A directional well is an oil industry term for an oil well with a borehole that deviates from a vertically straight line. This is normally done with the intention of hitting several target sands, for instance.

References

External links 
 Directional well, Oilfield Glossary, Schlumberger
  
Petroleum engineering
Oilfield terminology
Drilling technology